Myrmage dishani is a species of spiders of the genus Myrmage. It is endemic to Sri Lanka. The species was first found from Eastern part of Sinharaja Forest Reserve. The species can easily identified by the round opisthosoma, without any visible, constrict. However, the species is much similar to Myrmage imbellis syn.: Myrmarachne imbellis.

References

Salticidae
Spiders described in 2015
Spiders of Asia
Endemic fauna of Sri Lanka